The Women's Doubles tournament at the 1955 French Championships was held from 24 May to 5 June 1955 on the outdoor clay courts at the Stade Roland Garros in Paris, France. The American team of Beverly Fleitz and Darlene Hard won the title, defeating the British pair of Shirley Bloomer and Pat Ward in the final in three sets.

Draw

Finals

Top half

Bottom half

References

French Championships - Women's Doubles
French Open by year – Women's doubles
1955 in French women's sport
1955 in French tennis